In the administrative divisions of Qatar, zones are the second-highest level of government after municipalities. As of the 2015 census, there were 98 zones. However, several of these zones are not currently in use. Over the years, numerous changes in zones have taken place. For instance, in the 2010 census, Zone 69 was transferred to Al Daayen Municipality, Zones 50 and 58 were added to Ad-Dawhah Municipality, and part of Zone 74 was merged with Zone 70 of Al Daayen Municipality.

Zones 1 – 50, 57, 58, and 60 – 68 are reserved for Ad-Dawhah Municipality; Zones 51 – 56, 81, 83, 96 and 97 are reserved for Al Rayyan Municipality; Zones 69 and 70 are reserved for Al Daayen Municipality; Zone 71 is reserved for Umm Salal Municipality; Zones 74 – 76 are reserved for Al Khor Municipality; Zones 77 – 79 are reserved for Al Shamal Municipality; Zones 90 – 95 and 98 are reserved for Al Wakrah Municipality; and Zones 72, 73, 80, 82, and 84 – 86 are reserved for Al-Shahaniya Municipality.

Zones are composed of planning districts, of which there are 773 as of 2015. The lowest statistical unit used for planning is a census block, of which the total in 2010 was 4,344, increasing from 2,464 in 2004.

Zones by municipality

Ad Dawhah Municipality

There are 52 zones designated in Ad Dawhah Municipality as of 2015.

Al Rayyan Municipality
There are 10 zones designated in Al Rayyan Municipality as of 2015.

Al Daayen Municipality
There are 2 zones designated in Al Daayen Municipality as of 2015.

Umm Salal Municipality
There is 1 zone designated in Umm Salal Municipality as of 2015.

Al Khor Municipality
There are 3 zones designated in Al Khor Municipality as of 2015.

Al Shamal Municipality
There are 3 zones designated in Al Shamal Municipality as of 2015.

Al Shahaniya Municipality
There are 10 zones designated in Al-Shahaniya Municipality as of 2015.

Al Wakrah Municipality
There are 7 zones designated in Al Wakrah Municipality as of 2015.

References

 
Subdivisions of Qatar
Qatar, Zones
Qatar 2
Zones, Qatar
Qatar geography-related lists